Stagville Plantation is located in Durham County, North Carolina. With buildings constructed from the late 18th century to the mid-19th century, Stagville was part of one of the largest plantation complexes in the American South.

Among structures on the Stagville site are several historic houses and barns, including the original Bennehan House and some of the original slave quarters, which were in an area known as Horton Grove.

The Bennehan House, built 1787 with a large addition in 1799, was listed on the National Register of Historic Places in 1973; Horton Grove, an area of two-story slave residences built in 1850, was listed in 1978.  The slave residences are well preserved and are the only two-story slave quarters remaining in North Carolina.  Significant archaeological finds around the quarters have given archaeologists and historians a glimpse into the lives of the many enslaved people who lived and worked at Stagville and throughout the Bennehan-Cameron holdings.

In 1976, Liggett and Meyers Tobacco Company, which had owned and worked the land for decades, donated some of the acreage to the state of North Carolina, which now operates the property as Historic Stagville State Historic Site, a historic house museum, which belongs to the North Carolina Department  of Natural and Cultural Resources.

Notes

External links
  Historic Stagville - official site
 North Carolina Historic Site: Historic Stagville
 The Plantation Letters Project: Selections from Cameron Family Letters

Sources 

 Anderson, Jean Bradley. Piedmont Plantation: The Bennehan-Cameron Family and Lands in North Carolina. Durham: Historic Preservation Society, 1985
 Anderson, Jean Bradley. A History of Durham County, North Carolina. Durham: Duke University Press, 1991

Archaeological sites in North Carolina
Archaeological sites on the National Register of Historic Places in North Carolina
North Carolina in the American Civil War
Houses on the National Register of Historic Places in North Carolina
Historic house museums in North Carolina
Plantation houses in North Carolina
Open-air museums in North Carolina
Museums in Durham County, North Carolina
Georgian architecture in North Carolina
North Carolina State Historic Sites
National Register of Historic Places in Durham County, North Carolina
Houses in Durham County, North Carolina
Slave cabins and quarters in the United States